Yan Weiwen (born August 1957) is a contemporary Chinese opera singer with origins in the People's Liberation Army. He rose to fame through this involvement in the performing arts troupe of the PLA's General Political Department.

Yan has four signature works: The Little Poplar Tree, Mother, Words From My Heart, and The 1-2-3-4 Song. Yan has performed all four songs on the annual CCTV New Year's Gala, to critical acclaim.

Biography 
Yan was born in Pingyao County, Shanxi in 1957 (some sources say he was born in Taiyuan). Yan entered Shanxi Song and Dance Troupe when he was 13. At age 15, he joined the Chinese People's Liberation Army. He studied music under Zhang Xiao, Wei Jinrong, Jin Tielin and Cheng Zhi.

Personal life 
Yan has a daughter named Yan Jingjing.

Filmography

References 

20th-century Chinese male opera singers
1957 births
Living people
People from Taiyuan
21st-century Chinese male opera singers
21st-century Chinese male actors
Chinese male film actors
Singers from Shanxi
Male actors from Shanxi